Csepel Island (Hungarian: Csepel-sziget) is an island on the Danube in Hungary.

The isle extends south from Budapest; its northern point or section is Csepel – Budapest's District XXI. Most of the island is accessible from Budapest by the suburban railway. Towns include Ráckeve, Szigetszentmiklós, Szigethalom and Tököl.

Csepel island was the first centre of the Hungarian conquest of the Carpathian Basin (: "conquest of the homeland"), being the early homestead of Árpád's tribe.  The island is named after Árpád's horse groom, Csepel.

It features Hungary's tallest structure, Lakihegy Tower, a  radio mast used today intermittently for power network control purposes.

References

External links

River islands of Hungary
Islands of the Danube
Geography of Budapest